Daniel Allen Bronoske (born February 1980) is an American firefighter and politician of the Democratic Party. In 2020, he was elected to the Washington House of Representatives to represent the 28th legislative district and took office on January 11, 2021.

References

External links 
 Dan Bronoske at ballotpedia.org

1980 births
Living people
American firefighters
21st-century American politicians
People from Tacoma, Washington
Democratic Party members of the Washington House of Representatives